Brandon Bernstein (born August 2, 1972) is an American former drag racing driver. He is the son of NHRA legend Kenny Bernstein.

Early life
Bernstein was born in Dallas, Texas on August 2, 1972 the son of six-time NHRA Champion Kenny Bernstein. He worked with his dad's racing team when he was a teenager. Bernstein attended Texas A&M University and graduated with a Bachelor of Science degree in kinesiology, specializing in Sports Management in 1996.

Racing career
In 2001, Bernstein competed in the NHRA Top Alcohol Series and eventually won driver of the year honors. In April of the same year, Brandon and father Kenny became the first father-son duo in NHRA history to win at the same national event when they “doubled” at the SummitRacing.com Nationals in Las Vegas. They doubled again at the Lucas Oil Products Nationals in Chicago in June 2001.

In 2002, Bernstein worked solely as a crew member for his father's race team. In 2003, he made a sensational comeback to racing, winning 3 of the first 8 events of the season. In April, he was in command of the points when he suffered a major accident at Englishtown that sidelined him for the remainder of the season. Despite his accident he was named rookie of the year.

In 2004, he became the second Bernstein to hold the NHRA speed record when he set it at Chicago. In 2005 Bernstein won 2 events. In 2006, he logged 4 event wins and 3 runner up finishes ultimately finishing 3rd in the final points standings. In 2007 Bernstein won 5 events and contended for the championship but again finished 3rd in a close battle. In 2008, his last season with co-crew chiefs Tim and Kim Richards, the team made four final round appearances, finishing seventh in point standings. In 2009, under the guidance of crew chief Rob Flynn, Bernstein won in Richmond, Virginia, had four runner-up finishes and was No. 5 in 2009 NHRA Full Throttle point standings.

After losing his ride for Morgan Lucas Racing in 2013, Brandon became Al-Anabi Racing’s general manager. He is currently the GM for Alan Johnson Racing.

Personal life
Bernstein resides in Zionsville, Indiana with his wife Tracey and their two children Lyla & Landon. In his free time he likes computers, music, beach vacations and golfing.

See also
List of select Jewish racing drivers

External links
 Alan Johnson Racing

References

Living people
1972 births
Dragster drivers
Jewish American sportspeople
Sportspeople from Dallas
Texas A&M University alumni
Racing drivers from Dallas
Racing drivers from Texas
21st-century American Jews